Georgică Vameșu (born 3 November 1968) is a Romanian former footballer who played as a central defender.

Honours
Rapid București
Divizia B: 1989–90
Cupa României runner-up: 1994–95

References

1968 births
Living people
Romanian footballers
Association football midfielders
Liga I players
Liga II players
Belgian Pro League players
Challenger Pro League players
FC Rapid București players
R.W.D. Molenbeek players
K.F.C. Verbroedering Geel players
K.F.C. Dessel Sport players
Lierse Kempenzonen players
Romanian expatriate footballers
Expatriate footballers in Belgium
Romanian expatriate sportspeople in Belgium